The William Clark House, also known as the North Ward Center, is located in Newark, Essex County, New Jersey, United States. The house was built in 1879 at a cost of $200,000 and was added to the National Register of Historic Places on November 10, 1977. The house is a 28-room Queen Anne style designed by William Halsey Wood. The house was built for William Clark of the Clark Thread Company.

See also
National Register of Historic Places listings in Essex County, New Jersey

References

Houses on the National Register of Historic Places in New Jersey
Queen Anne architecture in New Jersey
Houses completed in 1879
Houses in Essex County, New Jersey
National Register of Historic Places in Newark, New Jersey
New Jersey Register of Historic Places